Colfax High School may refer to:

Colfax High School (California) in Colfax, California
Colfax Junior-Senior High School (Washington) in Colfax, Washington 
Colfax High School (Wisconsin) in Colfax, Wisconsin 
Colfax High School formerly in Colfax, Louisiana